Piecki  is a village in Mrągowo County, Warmian-Masurian Voivodeship, in north-eastern Poland. It is the seat of the gmina (administrative district) called Gmina Piecki. It is located in Masuria.

The village has a population of 2,610.

History
The origins of the village date back to 1401, when Piecio (Piecek) from Muszaki and Jakusz from Radomino were granted 45 and 15 włókas of land, respectively, to establish a village. It was named after one its co-founders.

Notable people
Natalia Nykiel (born 1995), Polish singer and songwriter

References

Piecki
Populated lakeshore places in Poland
Populated places established in the 1400s